Family Business is a 1989 American neo noir crime film directed by Sidney Lumet with a screenplay by Vincent Patrick, based on his novel. It stars Sean Connery, Dustin Hoffman and Matthew Broderick.

Plot 

Jessie McMullen (Sean Connery) is a Scottish American widower who emigrated with his Sicilian wife to New York in 1946. A lovable rogue, incorrigible womaniser and tough guy, Jessie is proud of his criminal past and lifestyle. He raised son Vito (Dustin Hoffman) to follow in his footsteps, but Vito went straight at 21 when his son Adam was born. Vito now runs a thriving wholesale Twelfth Avenue meat-packing warehouse and has left his criminal life behind.

Ashamed of his family's past, Vito married his working-class Jewish sweetheart and has tried to set a good example for their son, which in his mind means keeping Adam (Matthew Broderick) away from his criminally minded yet charming grandfather. Little does Vito understand that this strategy has backfired; the mystery surrounding Jessie, coupled with his strict educational upbringing, causing Adam to idolize his grandfather. Adam even puts up bail, borrowing it from Vito, one night after Jessie is charged with assault from a tavern fight.

Adam is in college with a scientific scholarship and has a bright future. However, six months before graduating, he drops out, complaining to Jessie that he was already "being put on a pension plan and they had my whole future mapped out." So when he unveils a scheme for a burglary, it impresses his grandfather, but Vito is surprised and bitterly disappointed. He warns his son not to pursue this and even slaps his face in a bar to drive home the point. This pushes Adam even closer to his grandfather, who can't wait to take a shot at a million-dollar payday.

Jesse chastises Adam's older girlfriend after hearing she's making money sitting on seven prime NYC apartments owned by terminally cancer patients via a contact in a cancer hospital, that it's immoral to steal from someone legally while taking no risk, calling her a parasite.

Jessie is eager to reenlist his reformed son Vito, calling the scheme "the sweetest deal of my life." The more he hears, the more tempted Vito is to give up the safe but dull life he has carved out for himself and return to the wild days of his youth. So the three generations of McMullens embark on one great criminal adventure, Vito begrudgingly saying yes on the premise that he is there to watch out for Adam along the way.

The plan is to steal valuable scientific research from a lab. It backfires horribly when, having seemingly pulled off the heist successfully, Adam forgets to take a logbook that is a vital prerequisite to being paid the million dollars. Adam dashes back into the building to retrieve it, but in his haste he sets off an alarm on his way out. Vito and Jessie can only watch helplessly from afar as Adam is captured by the police. At the last minute, Adam manages to throw the logbook over a fence which is retrieved by Jessie and Vito in the getaway car.

Vito is heartbroken and dreads his wife Elaine (Rosanna DeSoto) finding out what has happened. He and Jessie hire an expensive shyster lawyer for Adam's defense, but are told the only way for Adam to avoid a 15-year sentence is to give up his two mystery accomplices and "the goods" taken in the heist. Vito's wife angrily instructs him to give himself up along with Jessie, whatever it takes to get Adam a reduced sentence. Vito locates the vials stolen from the lab that Jessie's girlfriend Margie (Janet Carroll) has been safekeeping, Margie instructing him to "get that kid out of jail."

Discovering that the scientific research they stole had been faked,
by the company to buy six more months of research time, Jessie tracks down Adam's former professor Jimmy Chu (B.D. Wong) (who had double-crossed Adam by selling him on the robbery idea) and makes Chu pay him. A crestfallen Vito, meanwhile, gives in to his wife's suggestion that he give himself and Jessie up. He turns over the stolen goods, whereupon Jessie is taken into custody.

In court a judge (James Tolkan) finds all three McMullens to be at fault, but after generously placing both Vito and Adam on probation, he throws the book at Jessie, giving him a 15 year sentence, tantamount at his age to a sentence of life imprisonment.

Adam visits Jessie devotedly in jail while banning Vito from his life. Vito's explanations that he did what he did for Adam's own good fall on deaf ears. Adam calls him a "piece of garbage" and lambasts him for having "ratted out your own father."

Adam confidently says he's out from under Vito and Jesse replies can you get out from under me now?

Jessie dies in prison, but not before telling Adam that he spent all the money Jimmy Chu paid him to keep quiet and he didn't share any with him because he might be going to prison and had a little vigorish coming to him. Upon hearing Jesse is dying, Vito frantically attempts to see Jesse one last time but he is minutes late to say a last goodbye as Jesse died earlier that day. As the body is being carted away, Vito makes an attempt to view the body on its way to the morgue. The doors close and Vito breaks down in tears.

Vito and Adam eventually make their peace months later. Vito agrees with Adam that the most fun they have had as a family was the caper. Together, they give Jessie a grand sendoff, scattering his ashes from the roof of Vito's childhood home.

Cast
 Sean Connery as Jessie McMullen
 Dustin Hoffman as Vito McMullen
 Matthew Broderick as Adam McMullen
 Rosanna DeSoto as  Elaine McMullen (credited as Rosana DeSoto)
 Janet Carroll as Margie (Jessie's girl)
 Victoria Jackson as  Christine (Adam's girl)
 Bill McCutcheon as Danny Doheny (bar owner)
 Deborah Rush as  Michele Dempsey (Adam's lawyer)
 B.D. Wong as Jimmy Chui (Adam's former professor)
 John Capodice as Tommy
 Joe Lisi as Desk Sergeant
 Luis Guzmán as Torres
 James Tolkan as Judge
 Thomas A. Carlin as Neary 
 Rex Everhart as Ray Garvey 
 Tony DiBenedetto as Phil 
 Ed Crowley as Charlie 
 Aideen O'Kelly as Widow Doheny

Reception

The movie was critically panned, with The New York Times stating that whilst "the three stars are good actors[,] they have nothing much to work with. Their biggest challenge is to make the audience believe they are blood relatives, a question that would be quickly dismissed if the script were more compelling. The screenplay also seems to have thrown Mr. Lumet off stride. Among other things, he is usually an efficient director. Family Business, however, is so full of waste space that it has not one but two Irish wakes, where stolen clothing is sold to the mourners who get drunk and sing Danny Boy, which is at least once too often.

The Los Angeles Times stated that it was "a frail little caper movie that's overawed by its cast. With Sean Connery, Dustin Hoffman and Matthew Broderick playing three generations of a family, you've got a lot of talent at your disposal. Forget for the moment the fact that, in this movie about the persistence of family genes, none of the actors remotely resembles each other. Forget, too, that Dustin Hoffman is seven years younger than Connery, who plays his father here. Years of agent-inspired casting have inured audiences to weirder confabs than this. But there should be a pay-off to the oddness, some compelling dramatic reason for these three to get together. Like a good script, maybe. Instead, the movie lays out a slew of half-baked ideas and never turns on the burner."

Roger Ebert quipped, in an otherwise positive 3-star review, "What does Sidney Lumet's "Family Business" want to be? A caper movie, or a family drama? I ask because the movie seems to pursue both goals with equal success until about the three-quarter mark and then leaves leftover details of the caper hanging disconcertingly in midair."

 
Audiences surveyed by CinemaScore gave the film a grade "B-" on scale of A to F.

Box office

The movie debuted at No. 6. The film found greater success on video rentals.

References

External links

 
 

1989 films
American crime comedy-drama films
American heist films
Films about families
Films based on American novels
Films directed by Sidney Lumet
Films set in New York City
1980s crime comedy-drama films
TriStar Pictures films
Films scored by Cy Coleman
1980s heist films
1980s English-language films
1980s American films